El Aromillo  is a corregimiento in Cañazas District, Veraguas Province, Panama with a population of 1,359 as of 2010. It was created by Law 43 of August 5, 2002.

References

Corregimientos of Veraguas Province